Aebutina is a monotypic genus of South American cribellate araneomorph spiders in the family Dictynidae containing the single species, Aebutina binotata. It was first described by Eugène Simon in 1892, and has only been found in Ecuador and in Brazil.

References

Dictynidae
Monotypic Araneomorphae genera
Spiders of South America
Taxa named by Eugène Simon